Mohamed Aujjar (born 1959, Targuist) is a Moroccan politician of the National Rally of Independents party. Mr. Mohamed Aujjar, appointed by His Majesty King Mohammed VI, Minister of Justice, on Wednesday, April 5, 2017.

Education 
Aujjar holds a bachelor in law and worked as a journalist then editor-in-chief of the daily al-Mithaq. He has taken several training courses in the field of press and information in the United States, France and Portugal.

Political career 
In the parliamentary elections of September 27, 2002, he was elected as a member of the riding of Rabat-Océan.

On 7 November 2002, Mr. Aujjar was appointed by the Sovereign to the position of Minister of Human Rights in the cabinets of Driss Jettou and Abderrahmane Youssoufi, a position he held until 8 June 2004. He is a member of the "HACA", Morocco's media regulating body.

Mohamed Aujjar was the Ambassador permanent representative of the Kingdom of Morocco to the United Nations Office and other international organizations in Geneva between October 2014 and April 2017.

He is also a founding member of the Moroccan Organization of Human Rights (OMDH) and of the Press Club in Morocco. Author of several studies and contributions published in the Moroccan and Arab press, Mr. Aujjar also served as Deputy Secretary General of the National Union of the Moroccan Press (SNPM). 

He has chaired several international election observation missions in several African countries.

See also
Cabinet of Morocco

References

1959 births
Moroccan Berber politicians
Government ministers of Morocco
Living people
People from Targuist
Riffian people
Moroccan male journalists
Moroccan newspaper editors
Members of the House of Representatives (Morocco)
National Rally of Independents politicians